"Moving" is a song by English rock band Supergrass from their eponymous third album (1999). It is about the tedium of touring as a band. Released as a single in September 1999, "Moving" reached number nine on the UK Singles Chart, becoming Supergrass's last top-10 hit. In addition, it peaked at number 14 in Finland, where it is the band's sole top-20 hit, and number 81 in the Netherlands. The song later appeared on their greatest hits compilation Supergrass Is 10 (2004).

Music video
Directed by Nick Gordon, the video, like the song, is intended to depict the tedium of touring. The passing of time is shown by the change of outfits the band are wearing, their slight changes in appearance, the selection of different hotel rooms they are seen in, and the assortment of hotel room keys displayed. Footage is sped up and slowed down, and scenes are rewound and repeated to add to the film's effect.

Track listings

UK CD1 
 "Moving"
 "You Too Can Play Alright"
 "Pumping on Your Stereo" (CD ROM video)

UK CD2 and cassette single 
 "Moving"
 "Believer"
 "Faraway" (acoustic version)

UK limited-edition 7-inch blue vinyl single 
A. "Moving"
B. "Believer"

European CD single 
 "Moving"
 "Believer"
 "Faraway" (acoustic version)
 "You Too Can Play Alright"

Credits and personnel
Credits are taken from the Supergrass album booklet.

Studios
 Recorded at Sawmills Studios (Golant, UK) and Ridge Farm Studios (Rusper, UK)

Personnel

 Supergrass – writing, production
 Gaz Coombes – vocals, guitar
 Mick Quinn – bass, vocals
 Danny Goffey – drums, vocals
 Rob Coombes – writing, keyboards
 Satin Singh – extra percussion
 Gavyn Wright – strings
 Patrick Kiernan – violin
 Boguslaw Kostecki – violin
 Jackie Shave – violin
 Bill Benham – viola
 Andrew Parker – viola
 Martin Loveday – cello
 Frank Schaefer – cello
 John Cornfield – production, mixing

Charts

References

Supergrass songs
1999 singles
1999 songs
Parlophone singles
Songs written by Rob Coombes